Cayuse may refer to:

Cayuse people, a people native to Oregon, United States
Cayuse language, an extinct language of the Cayuse people
Cayuse, Oregon, an unincorporated community in the United States
Cayuse horse, an archaic term for a feral or low-quality horse or pony
OH-6 "Cayuse", a military observation helicopter
Cayuse Five, five Cayuse who were hanged for murder

See also
Cayoosh Flat is also the old name for the town of Lillooet, British Columbia